Geylang East, more commonly known as Eunos, is a subzone located in Geylang in the Central Region of Singapore. The vicinity is served by both Paya Lebar and Eunos MRT stations.

"Eunos" is also the name given to a street called  which spans the area.

Etymology and History 

The settlement was originally named Kampong Melayu, a large Malay village that used to include Kampong Ubi and Kaki Bukit areas. It was later renamed  Eunos in honour of its founder, .

Eunos was the Chairman and co-founder of the Singapore Malay Union and the first Malay representative of the Legislative Council, the then governing body of Singapore. In 1927, he appealed to the government and was granted $700,000 that the Singapore Malay Union used for the purchase of 670 hectares of land, which later became known as Kampong Melayu. This land was used to provide a home for Malays who were affected by the building of Singapore’s first airport at Kallang.

References 

Places in Singapore
Housing estates in Singapore
Geylang